Natallia Safronnikava, née Vinogradova (born 28 February 1973 in Vawkavysk) is a retired Belarusian sprinter, who mainly competed in the 200 metres.

Safronnikava won her first international medal (a bronze) at the 2001 IAAF World Indoor Championships, and won a gold medal in 2004 - Anastasiya Kapachinskaya of Russia originally finished first, but was disqualified after she tested positive for the anabolic steroid stanozolol.

Safronnikava's winning time of 23.13 seconds was the slowest the title had been won in, and as the event has not been contested since, she is the most recent champion as of 2021.

She retired from international athletics in June 2010.

Achievements

Personal bests
60 metres - 7.04 s (2001, indoor) 
100 metres - 11.05 s (2003)
200 metres - 22.68 s (2001)
Triple jump - 14.31 m (2006, indoor)

References

External links

1973 births
Living people
Belarusian female sprinters
Athletes (track and field) at the 1996 Summer Olympics
Athletes (track and field) at the 2004 Summer Olympics
Olympic athletes of Belarus
European Athletics Championships medalists
Universiade medalists in athletics (track and field)
Universiade bronze medalists for Belarus
World Athletics Indoor Championships winners
Medalists at the 2001 Summer Universiade
People from Vawkavysk
Olympic female sprinters
Sportspeople from Grodno Region